Trifolium campestre, commonly known as hop trefoil, field clover and low hop clover, is a species of flowering plant native to Europe and western Asia, growing in dry, sandy grassland habitats, fields, woodland margins, roadsides, wastelands and cultivated land. The species name campestre means "of the fields".

Description
It is a herbaceous annual plant, growing to 10–30 cm tall, with distinctive yellow flowerheads that superficially resemble hop flowers.  Each flowerhead is a cylindrical or spherical collection of 20–40 individual flowers. The flowers become brown upon aging and drying, enclosing the fruit, a one-seeded pod. The leaves are alternate and trifoliate, with three oblong or elliptical leaflets 4–10 mm long.

This species is very closely related to large hop trefoil (Trifolium aureum).

Cultivation and uses

Hop trefoil is an important clover in agriculture because its foliage is good for feeding livestock and replenishing soil. It is not generally planted, but is considered a valuable herb when found growing in a pasture. It has become naturalised in North America, particularly in the west and south of the continent.

Similar plants
Hop trefoil, Trifolium campestre, may be confused with other plants that have three leaflets and small yellow flowers, such as large hop trefoil (T. aureum), lesser hop trefoil (T. dubium), black medick (Medicago lupulina), and yellow woodsorrel (Oxalis stricta).

References 

 Ajilvsgi, Geyata. (2003). Wildflowers of Texas. Shearer Publishing, Fredericksburg, Texas. .

External links

Washington Burke Museum
Jepson Manual Treatment
Illinois Wildflowers
Discover Life: Trifolium campestre 
Purdue New Crops: Hop clovers

Flora of Europe
Flora of Lebanon
campestre
Flora of Lebanon and Syria
Flora of Maghreb